Sudan III is a lysochrome (fat-soluble dye) diazo dye.  It is structurally related to azobenzene.

Uses
It is used to color nonpolar substances such as oils, fats, waxes, greases, various hydrocarbon products, and acrylic emulsions.  Its main use is as a fuel dye in the United States of America mandated by the Internal Revenue Service (IRS) to distinguish low-taxed heating oil from automotive diesel fuel, and by the United States Environmental Protection Agency (EPA) to mark fuels with higher sulfur content; it is a replacement for Solvent Red 26 with better solubility in hydrocarbons. The IRS requires "a concentration spectrally equivalent to at least 3.9 pounds of... Solvent Red 26 per thousand barrels of fuel"; the concentrations required by EPA are roughly 5 times lower. It should be stored at room temperature.

Biological staining
Sudan III is a dye used for Sudan staining. Similar dyes include Oil Red O, Sudan IV, and Sudan Black B. They are used for staining of triglycerides in frozen sections, and some protein bound lipids and lipoproteins on paraffin sections. It has the appearance of reddish brown crystals and a maximum absorption at 507(304) nm. It has a more orange shade than Oil Red O, lending to its less popular status. In botany, it is used with Light Green SF Yellowish to differentiate between suberized and cutinized plant tissue.

Safety
Sudan I, Sudan III, and Sudan IV have been classified as category 3 carcinogens by the International Agency for Research on Cancer.

References

Susan Budavari, Editor, (1996). The Merck Index, Ed. 12. Merck & Co., Inc., Whitehouse Station, NJ, USA
Edward Gurr, (1971). Synthetic Dyes in Biology, Medicine and Chemistry. Academic Press, London, England.

External links
 Stains File entry

Azo dyes
Staining dyes
Sudan dyes
IARC Group 3 carcinogens
2-Naphthols
Fuel dyes